was a Japanese samurai of the Azuchi-Momoyama period, he was a third son of Shimazu Takahisa, who served as a general officer and senior retainer of the Shimazu clan of Satsuma Province.

He was fought in Battle of Mimigawa (1578), Siege of Minamata Castle (1581) during Shimazu clan campaign to conquer Kyūshū and also the commander of Shimazu clan against Toyotomi Hideyoshi, when Hideyoshi invaded Kyushu (1587). He didn't surrender to Hideyoshi and kept on fighting even after his brother Yoshihisa surrendered.

Later in 1592, at the time of uprising against Hideyoshi, the incident at Taihei-ji Temple was raised as an issue; this led Hideyoshi to issue an order to track down and kill Toshihisa which made him commit suicide by seppuku at Ryugamizu.

References

Samurai
1537 births
1592 deaths
Shimazu clan
Deified Japanese people
People from Kagoshima Prefecture